Lars ten Teije (born 3 April 1998) is a Dutch professional footballer who plays as a winger for Vitesse.

Club career

Vitesse
Ten Teije first joined Vitesse in 2007, from local side Victoria Boys. After featuring during pre-season, ten Teije was named as unused substitute in Vitesse's Johan Cruyff Shield defeat against Feyenoord. On 8 September 2017, ten Teije signed his first professional contract with Vitesse, agreeing to a three-year deal. A day later, ten Teije made his first-team debut during Vitesse's 3–0 away victory against Excelsior, replacing Tim Matavž in the 83rd minute.

Career statistics

References

1998 births
Living people
Sportspeople from Apeldoorn
Association football midfielders
Dutch footballers
Eredivisie players
SBV Vitesse players
Netherlands youth international footballers
Footballers from Gelderland
20th-century Dutch people
21st-century Dutch people